Turini (Aymara turi tower, -ni a suffix, "the one with a tower", also spelled Torrini) is a  mountain in the Chilla-Kimsa Chata mountain range in the Andes of Bolivia. It is located in the La Paz Department, Ingavi Province, Jesús de Machaca Municipality, and in the Los Andes Province, Laja Municipality. It lies near Q'ilani.

References 

Mountains of La Paz Department (Bolivia)